Border Field State Park is a  state park of California, United States, containing beach and coastal habitat on the Mexico–United States border.  The park is within the city limits of Imperial Beach in San Diego County, next to the suburb of Playas de Tijuana in Mexico. It contains the southernmost point in the state of California.  The refuge forms the southern part of the Tijuana River National Estuarine Research Reserve.

Border Field State Park contains International Friendship Park, which is just inland from the place where the border meets the ocean.  Immediately adjacent is the monument marking the Initial Point of Boundary Between U.S. and Mexico.

History
The Treaty of Guadalupe Hidalgo was concluded on February 2, 1848, officially ending the war between the United States and Mexico. It provided that the new international border between the two countries be established by a joint United States and Mexican Boundary Survey. The commission began its survey at Border Field. During World War II it was base for Border Naval Outlying Landing Field

Habitat
The Tijuana River National Estuarine Research Reserve contains much of Border Field State Park and is an important wildlife habitat. The salt and freshwater marshes give refuge to migrating waterfowl and resident wading birds, such as black-necked stilt, American avocet, green-winged teal, American wigeon and pelicans. The park offers hiking, horse trails, surf fishing and birding.

Visitors
For fiscal year 2014–2015 61,799 people visited the Border Field State Park, up from 45,633 in FY 2011–2012.

See also
Initial Point of Boundary Between U.S. and Mexico
Friendship Park
Imperial Beach
 List of beaches in San Diego County
 List of California state parks
Mexico–United States international park
Playas de Tijuana
Tijuana River (Río Tijuana)
Tijuana River National Estuarine Research Reserve
Tortilla Wall

References

External links

 Border Field State Park 
 Border Field State Park (Tijuana River National Estuarine Research Reserve)

State parks of California
Parks in San Diego County, California
Beaches of San Diego County, California
Imperial Beach, California
South Bay (San Diego County)
Mexico–United States border
Protected areas established in 1972
1972 establishments in California
Beaches of Southern California